Roxx Gang was an American glam metal band formed in 1982 in St. Petersburg, Florida. It was fronted by Kevin Steele, who formed the band along with guitarist Eric Carrell.

History
The band garnered record company attention in 1987 with its Love 'Em and Leave 'Em demo. The band recorded its debut album Things You've Never Done Before (1988) on Virgin Records from which it released two singles "No Easy Way Out" and "Scratch My Back" with the lineup now consisting of Steele, Jeff Taylor Blanchard (guitar), Wade Hayes (guitar), Roby "Strychnine" Strine (bass), and David James Blackshire (drums). It was produced by Beau Hill and went on to sell a quarter million copies worldwide.

This version of the band broke up in 1991 because of infighting and record company issues. Steele then formed a new version of the band along with Roby Strine, guitarist Dallas Perkins and professional session/touring drummer Andy James from NYC. Years later drummer Tommy Weder and guitarist Stacey Blades replaced James and Perkins. Strine left in 1994 and was replaced by Dorian Sage. The band released the album The Voodoo You Love, its first album since Things You've Never Done Before, and went on to release several more albums in the late 1990s. The band added guitarist Jeff Vitolo and  bassist Allen Brooks replaced Sage. Soon after Roxx Gang created a blues/rock alter-ego The Mojo Gurus. Vinnie Granese replaced Brooks in 1998 and Blades left citing "musical differences" after which evolution into The Mojo Gurus became permanent.

In 2006, two of its songs off of the Things You've Never Done Before album, "Ball 'N Chain" and "No Easy Way Out" were featured in the THQ action-adventure video game Saints Row.

Members

Former

 Kevin Steele lead vocals and harmonica (1982–1991, 1992–2000)
 Jeff Vitolo guitar & backing vocals (1996–2000)
 Vinnie Granese bass guitar and backing vocals (1998–2000)
 Tommy Weder drums and backing vocals (1994–2000)
 Allen Brooks bass guitar and backing vocals (1996–1998)
 Eric Carrell guitar (1982–1987; died 1987)
 Jeff Taylor Blanchard guitar (1987–1991)
 Stacey Blades guitar (1994–1998)
 Wade Hayes guitar (1987–1991)
 Roby "Strychnine" Strine bass guitar (1987–1991, 1992–1994)
 David James Blackshire drums (1987–1991)
 Dallas Perkins guitar (1992–1994)
 Andy James drums (1991–1994)
 Dorian Sage bass guitar (1994–1996; died 2021)
 Pete Clauss bass guitar (1982–1987)
 Doug Denardin drums (1982–1987)

Discography
Things You've Never Done Before (1988)
The Voodoo You Love (1995)
Love 'Em and Leave 'Em (1997)
Mojo Gurus (1998)
Old, New, Borrowed, and Blue (1998)
Drinkin' T.N.T. and Smokin' Dynamite (2000)
Bodacious Ta Tas (2001)
Boxx of Roxx (Box Set) (2011)
  Last Laugh: The Lost Roxx Gang Demos (2014)

See also

 List of glam metal bands and artists
 List of Virgin Records artists
 Music of Florida

References

External links
 

1982 establishments in Florida
1991 disestablishments in Florida
1992 establishments in the United States
2000 disestablishments in the United States
Culture of St. Petersburg, Florida
Glam metal musical groups from Florida
Heavy metal musical groups from Florida
Musical groups disestablished in 1991
Musical groups disestablished in 2000
Musical groups established in 1982
Musical groups reestablished in 1992
Virgin Records artists